Kabul International Cricket Stadium (previously known as the Alokozay Kabul International Cricket Stadium) is a cricket stadium in Kabul, Afghanistan, which opened in 2011 and has a seating capacity of 6,000 spectators. It is the first international cricket stadium to be constructed in the country and is the home of cricket in Afghanistan. The stadium is located close to Ghazi Stadium. In May 2015, the Alokozay Group of Companies took sponsorship of Afghanistan national cricket team and the stadium.

History
It was constructed and opened in 2011 and was funded by USAID and implemented by CARE International with technical support of Afghanistan Cricket Board. Since the opening of the stadium in December 2011, the ACB has been using it for a range of cricket activities and education.

Many domestic cricket events take place each year including: local provincial, regional and national tournaments, school Cricket tournaments, disability tournaments, and player training camps.

The ACB outdoor cricket academy operates its sessions daily at the stadium and the National Offices of the ACB operate within the stadium.

A key development for the stadium over the coming 12 months will be the construction and development of the Afghanistan National Cricket Academy which has recently been funded by the International Cricket Council.

The first match was between Nangarhar and AWCC. Nangarhar was the winner.

On 29 July 2022, a grenade explosion occurred within the stadium among a crowd of spectators during a cricket match between the Pamir Zalmi and Band-e-Amir Dragons, killing at least two people and injuring 13.

See also 
Ghazi Amanullah International Cricket Stadium
Kandahar International Cricket Stadium

References

External links 
 , May 30, 2016, Al Jazeera English.
 Kabul International Cricket Stadium at Cricinfo

Cricket grounds in Afghanistan
Buildings and structures in Kabul
2011 establishments in Afghanistan
Sports venues completed in 2011